Brendan Fernandes (born 1979) is a Canadian contemporary artist. He specializes in installation and visual art and currently serves as a faculty member at Northwestern University teaching art theory and practice.

Early life 
Fernandes was born in Nairobi,  Kenya, in 1979. His family, Indians in Kenya of Goan descent,   moved to Canada when he was nine years old.  Fernandes went to school in Newmarket, Ontario.

Education 
Fernandes trained professionally as a ballet dancer, but tore his hamstring during his senior year in college, and the injury ended his dance career. He went on to train as a visual artist and completed his Bachelor of Fine Arts degree at York University in Toronto, and then pursued a Master of Fine Arts at the University of Western Ontario, in London, Ontario.  In 2006, he participated in the Independent Study Program at the Whitney Museum of American Art in Manhattan, New York.

Exhibitions and performances 
Fernandes exhibited a series of sculptures and live performances at The Graham Foundation titled The Master and Form, in 2018. The series explored mastery and discipline within the culture of ballet through the use of designed objects that enable dancers to perfect and extend iconic positions. This work was featured in the 2019 Biennial at the Whitney Museum of American Art.

In 2017 at the Getty Museum in Los Angeles Fernandes presented Free Fall 49, a work that addressed the 2016 massacre at The Pulse Nightclub in Orlando. The performance was a choreography of eight dancers, improvised over two hours of music produced by Tom Krell of How to Dress Well.  Music samples interspersed at abrupt intervals – reminiscent of the staccato of gunfire, the beat cut into the propulsive music 49 times, cuing the dancers first to hit the ground, then rise in moments of memorial and resurrection. This performance art piece was later presented in the Kogod Courtyward of the Smithsonian American Art Museum in June 2019.

In 2011, Fernandes was included in Found in Translation, exhibition at The Solomon R Guggenheim Museum, New York.

On the occasion of Fernandes'  Noguchi Museum project he has published a book titled Re/Form in 2022.

References 

1979 births
Living people
Kenyan people of Indian descent
Canadian people of Goan descent
Kenyan emigrants to Canada
Canadian people of Indian descent
Canadian performance artists
Canadian video artists
University of Western Ontario alumni
York University alumni
Canadian sculptors
Canadian male sculptors
Canadian gay artists
Canadian male ballet dancers
Canadian choreographers
21st-century Canadian LGBT people